Town Creek is a  tributary stream of the Potomac River in the U.S. states of Maryland and Pennsylvania. Town Creek flows south along the base of Warrior Mountain into Allegany County, Maryland. The Chesapeake and Ohio Canal crosses it at the Town Creek Aqueduct.

See also
List of rivers of Maryland
List of rivers of Pennsylvania
Town Creek (Patuxent River)
Town Creek (Tred Avon River)

References

External links

Rivers of Allegany County, Maryland
Rivers of Maryland
Rivers of Pennsylvania
Rivers of Bedford County, Pennsylvania
Tributaries of the Potomac River